Freddy de Vree (3 October 1939 in Antwerp – 3 July 2004 in Antwerp), pseudonym Marie-Claire de Jonghe, was a Belgian poet, literary critic and radiomaker. The past and death play an important role in his oeuvre. He was a friend of W.F. Hermans and Sylvia Kristel.

Freddy de Vree made his literary debut in 1966 with Goudfluit (E: Golden flute). As a poet, he made his debut in 1969 with Jaja (E: Yesyes), and in the same year he published De lemen liefde (E: Love of loam).

Bibliography
 A Pollen in the Air (?) 
 Het boek Alfa (?) 
 Le tombeau de Pierre Larousse (?) 
 Orbis militaris (?) 
 Mots pour Karin (1963) 
 Blues pour Boris Vian (1965) 
 De lemen liefde (1969) 
 Jaja (1969) 
 A.C. (1971) 
 Alsof zij niets was (1973) 
 Rita Renoir, enz. (1973) 
 Beleggen en beliegen (1975) 
 Hugo Claus (1976) 
 Pierre Alechinsky (1976) 
 Steden en sentimenten (1976) 
 De dodenklas (1977) 
 Zao Wou-ki (1977) 
 Erfgenamen van de dood (1978) 
 Mexico vandaag (1982) 
 Moravagine of de vervloeking (1982) 
 Karel Appel (1983) 
 Chicago! (1984) 
 Jan Cremer (1984) 
 De God Denkbaar Denkbaar De God (1985) 
 Wyckaert (1986) 
 Drie ogen zo blauw (1987) 
 Jan Vanriet (1996)

Awards
 1977 - Arkprijs van het Vrije Woord

See also
 Flemish literature

Sources
 Freddy de Vree 
 G.J. van Bork en P.J. Verkruijsse, De Nederlandse en Vlaamse auteurs (1985)

1939 births
2004 deaths
Flemish writers
Ark Prize of the Free Word winners

International Writing Program alumni